Liberata Masoliver (1911–1996)  was a Spanish novelist who wrote extensively during the period of the Francoist State from the perspective of a conservative ideology. The themes of her work include the Spanish Civil War, the Spanish colonial experience in Equatorial Guinea and Ethiopia, and life in Francoist Spain.

Bibliography
Her books include 

Efún (1955)   
Los Galiano (1957)
Selva negra, selva verde (1959)
El rebelde (1960)
La bruixa (1961)
Barcelona en llamas (1961)
La mujer del colonial (1962)
Maestro albañil (1963)
Pecan los buenos (1964)
Nieve y alquitrán (1965) 
Un camino Ilega a la cumbre (1966)
La retirada (1967)
Casino Veraniego (1968) 
Hombre de paz (1969)
Telón (1969)
Dios con nosotros (1970)
Estés donde estés (1972)
Los mini-amores de Angelines (1972)

References

1911 births
1996 deaths
20th-century Spanish novelists